L183 or L134N is a much-studied pre-stellar core in the constellation Serpens Cauda 360 light-years away. This massive accumulation of gas and dust was the interstellar object in which the phenomenon of coreshine was first investigated by astronomers and produced a new means of probing its previously opaque core.

External links
BIMA N2H+ 1-0 Mapping Observations of L183: Fragmentation and Spin-Up in a Collapsing, Magnetized, Rotating, Prestellar Core

References

Pre-stellar cores
Serpens (constellation)
Star-forming regions